Blackbud are an English indie rock band from Wiltshire, comprising Joe Taylor (guitar, vocals), Adam Newton (bass, backing vocals) and Sam Nadel (drums, backing vocals). Blackbud have been compared to artists such as Jeff Buckley, Radiohead and Led Zeppelin, and have toured extensively, to critical acclaim, having attracted the attention of Jimmy Page, Michael Eavis and Steve Lamacq, amongst other noteworthy people. In January 2010, the band entered an indefinite hiatus.

The band's debut album, From The Sky, was released on 31 July 2006, while their self-titled second album, Blackbud was released on 8 June 2009, with digital-only single "You Can Run" preceding it by one week.

History

Formation
The band met at St Laurence School in their hometown of Bradford on Avon, Wiltshire. Having discovered they had the same musical interests, Taylor, Nadel, and Newton formed Blackbud in December 2002. The name, amongst many various interpretations, probably being derived from the bud of a plant/flower. Blackbud began as a covers band, and secured a residency at a local pub. They would mainly play sets comprising covers of songs by Jimi Hendrix, Bob Marley and Stevie Ray Vaughan. As time went on, Taylor began writing his own songs and three demo CDs were recorded during the band's first 18 months.

Recording contract
In 2005, Blackbud signed to Independiente Records, a British independent record label whose roster included Gomez, Travis and Embrace. The deal came after several major labels showed a considerable amount of interest in the band.  After much deliberation, the band concluded that an independent would best suit their ethos. This record deal was a result of coming Joint First in the Glastonbury 2004 Unsigned bands competition.

Self-titled album (2009) and hiatus
In 2009, the band released their second studio album, Blackbud.

In January 2010, the band entered an indefinite hiatus, stating:

In December 2012, Joe Taylor hinted on the band's YouTube page that they will "hopefully be recording new material soon".

Discography

Studio albums
From the Sky (2006)
Blackbud (2009)

EPs and singles
The Livewire EP (2005)
"Heartbeat" (2005)
"Barefoot Dancing" (2006)
"Forever" (2006)
"You Can Run" (2009)

Song appearances
"Barefoot Dancing" appeared on The Skeleton Key soundtrack.

Members
Joe Taylor - guitar, vocals
Sam Nadel - drums, backing vocals
Adam Newton - bass, backing vocals

References

External links
Official website
Official MySpace
XFM article
Film by Richard Gooderick
Stereokill interview 2009

English rock music groups
Independiente Records artists